Orlando Aponte Rosario is a Puerto Rican politician affiliated with the Popular Democratic Party (PPD). He was elected to the Puerto Rico House of Representatives in 2020 to represent District 26.

Early life and education
Took his most of his early education at public schools in Barranquitas, Puerto Rico. He completed his bachelor's degree in Social Sciences, with a concentration in Political Science, at the University of Puerto Rico at Cayey. In addition, during his baccalaureate he took courses in economics and finance at Murray State University, in Kentucky. In 2010 earned a Juris Doctor from the University of Puerto Rico School of Law. Started law practice at same year.

Political career
Orlando Aponte Rosario was elected in the november 2020 election for the 26th district Puerto Rico House of Representatives. He is the chair of the Legal Commission.

References

1984 births
Living people
Popular Democratic Party members of the House of Representatives of Puerto Rico
People from Aibonito, Puerto Rico
University of Puerto Rico alumni